The House of Providence, also known as The Academy (or Academy building), is a former orphanage and school located in Vancouver, Washington.  It was built c. 1873 by Mother Joseph of the Sacred Heart.

History
Mother Joseph Pariseau raised money for the construction of the House of Providence and other charitable institutions by leading begging tours through local mining camps. The building, constructed in 1873 and designed by Pariseau, has three stories and was constructed in brick in a neo-Georgian style. The house functioned as a school until 1969.

It was listed on the National Register of Historic Places in 1978.

Gallery

See also

 National Register of Historic Places listings in Clark County, Washington

References

Buildings and structures in Vancouver, Washington
Georgian architecture in Washington (state)
Houses on the National Register of Historic Places in Washington (state)
Houses completed in 1873
Houses in Clark County, Washington
National Register of Historic Places in Clark County, Washington